Messenger is a proprietary instant messaging app and platform developed by Meta Platforms. Originally developed as Facebook Chat in 2008, the company revamped its messaging service in 2010, released standalone iOS and Android apps in 2011, and released standalone Facebook Portal hardware for Messenger calling in 2018. In April 2015, Facebook launched a dedicated website interface, Messenger.com, and separated the messaging functionality from the main Facebook app, allowing users to use the web interface or download one of the standalone apps. In April 2020, Facebook released a Messenger desktop app for Windows and macOS.

Messenger is used to send messages and exchange photos, videos, stickers, audio, and files, and also react to other users' messages and interact with bots. The service also supports voice and video calling. The standalone apps support using multiple accounts, conversations with optional end-to-end encryption, and playing games.

History 

Following tests of a new instant messaging platform on Facebook in March 2008, the feature, then-titled "Facebook Chat", was gradually released to users in April 2008. Facebook revamped its messaging platform in November 2010, and subsequently acquired group messaging service Beluga in March 2011, which the company used to launch its standalone iOS and Android mobile apps on August 9, 2011. Facebook later launched a BlackBerry version in October 2011. An app for Windows Phone, though lacking features including voice messaging and chat heads, was released in March 2014. In April 2014, Facebook announced that the messaging feature would be removed from the main Facebook app and users will be required to download the separate Messenger app. An iPad-optimized version of the iOS app was released in July 2014. In April 2015, Facebook launched a website interface for Messenger. A Tizen app was released on July 13, 2015. Facebook launched Messenger for Windows 10 in April 2016. In October 2016, Facebook released Messenger Lite, a stripped-down version of Messenger with a reduced feature set. The app is aimed primarily at old Android phones and regions where high-speed Internet is not widely available. In April 2017, Messenger Lite was expanded to 132 more countries. In May 2017, Facebook revamped the design for Messenger on Android and iOS, bringing a new home screen with tabs and categorization of content and interactive media, red dots indicating new activity, and relocated sections.

Facebook announced a Messenger program for Windows 7 in a limited beta test in November 2011. The following month, Israeli blog TechIT leaked a download link for the program, with Facebook subsequently confirming and officially releasing the program. The program was eventually discontinued in March 2014. A Firefox web browser add-on was released in December 2012, but was also discontinued in March 2014.

In December 2017, Facebook announced Messenger Kids, a new app aimed for persons under 13 years of age. The app comes with some differences compared to the standard version. In 2019, Messenger announced to be the 2nd most downloaded mobile app of the decade, from 2011 to 2019.
In December 2019, Messenger dropped support for users to sign in using only a mobile number, meaning that users must sign in to a Facebook account in order to use the service.

In March 2020, Facebook started to ship its dedicated Messenger for macOS app through the Mac App Store. The app is currently live in regions include France, Australia, Mexico and Poland.

In April 2020, Facebook began rolling out a new feature called Messenger Rooms, a video chat feature that allows users to chat with up to 50 people at a time. The feature rivals Zoom, an application that gained a lot of popularity during the COVID-19 pandemic. Privacy concerns arose since the feature uses the same data collection policies as mainstream Facebook.

In July 2020, Facebook added a new feature in Messenger that lets iOS users to use Face ID or Touch ID to lock their chats. The feature is called App Lock and is a part of several changes in Messenger regarding privacy and security. The option to view only "Unread Threads" was removed from the inbox, requiring the account holder to scroll through the entire inbox to be certain every unread message has been seen.

On October 13, 2020, Facebook's Messenger application introduced cross-app messaging with Instagram, which was launched in September 2021. In addition to the integrated messaging, the application announced the introduction of a new logo, which will be an amalgamation of the Messenger and Instagram logo.

Features 
The following is a table of features available in Messenger, as well as their geographical coverage and what devices they are available on. In addition there is a vanishing message feature. In addition there is an audio recording feature which allows audio recordings of up to one minute which may or may not be vanishing:

Messenger Rooms 
It is a video conferencing feature of Messenger. It allows users to add up to 50 people at a time. Messenger Rooms does not require a Facebook account. Messenger Rooms competes with other services such as Zoom.

Back in 2014, Facebook introduced an unrelated, stand-alone application named Rooms, letting users create places for users with similar interests, with users being anonymous to others. This was shut down in December 2015.

In April 2020, during the COVID-19 pandemic, Facebook revealed video conferencing features for Messenger called Messenger Rooms. This was seen as a response to the popularity of other video conferencing platforms such as Zoom and Skype in the midst of the COVID-19 pandemic.

Messenger Rooms allows users to add up to 50 people per room, without restrictions on time. It does not require a Facebook account or a separate app from Messenger. When used, it only prompts the user for basic information. Users can add 360° virtual backgrounds, mood lighting, and other AR effects as well as share screens. To prevent unwanted participants from joining, users can lock rooms and remove participants.

Some have voiced concerns in regards to Messenger Room's privacy and how its parent, Facebook, handles data. Messenger Rooms, unlike some of its competitors, does not use end-to-end encryption. In addition, there have been concerns over how Messenger Rooms collects user data.

Monetization
In January 2017, Facebook announced that it was testing showing advertisements in Messenger's home feed. At the time, the testing was limited to a "small number of users in Australia and Thailand", with the ad format being swipe-based carousel ads. In July, the company announced that they were expanding the testing to a global audience. Stan Chudnovsky, head of Messenger, told VentureBeat that "We’ll start slow ... When the average user can be sure to see them we truly don’t know because we’re just going to be very data-driven and user feedback-driven on making that decision". Facebook told TechCrunch that the advertisements' placement in the inbox depends on factors such as thread count, phone screen size, and pixel density. In a TechCrunch editorial by Devin Coldewey, he described the ads as "huge" in the space they occupy, "intolerable" in the way they appear in the user interface, and "irrelevant" due to the lack of context. Coldewey finished by writing "Advertising is how things get paid for on the internet, including TechCrunch, so I’m not an advocate of eliminating it or blocking it altogether. But bad advertising experiences can spoil a perfectly good app like (for the purposes of argument) Messenger. Messaging is a personal, purposeful use case and these ads are a bad way to monetize it."

Reception 
In November 2014, the Electronic Frontier Foundation (EFF) listed Messenger (Facebook chat) on its Secure Messaging Scorecard. It received a score of 2 out of 7 points on the scorecard. It received points for having communications encrypted in transit and for having recently completed an independent security audit. It missed points because the communications were not encrypted with keys the provider didn't have access to, users could not verify contacts' identities, past messages were not secure if the encryption keys were stolen, the source code was not open to independent review, and the security design was not properly documented.

As stated by Facebook in its Help Center, there is no way to log out of the Messenger application. Instead, users can choose between different availability statuses, including "Appear as inactive", "Switch accounts", and "Turn off notifications". Media outlets have reported on a workaround, by pressing a "Clear data" option in the application's menu in Settings on Android devices, which returns the user to the log-in screen.

User growth 
After being separated from the main Facebook app, Messenger had 600 million users in April 2015. This grew to 900 million in June 2016, 1 billion in July 2016, and 1.2 billion in April 2017.

In March 2020, total messaging traffic increased by 50% in countries that were on quarantine due to the COVID-19 outbreak. Group calls grew by more than 1,000%.

Government attempt at surveillance/decryption 
In early 2018, the US Department of Justice went to court to attempt to force Facebook to modify its Messenger app to enable surveillance by third parties so that agents could listen in on encrypted voice conversations over Messenger.
The court decided against the Justice Department, but sealed the case.
In November 2018, the ACLU and EFF filed suit to have the case unsealed so that the public can be informed about the encryption/surveillance debate. This motion was denied in February 2019, and an appeal was filed in April 2020.

See also

Messenger Kids
Comparison of cross-platform instant messaging clients
 Comparison of VoIP software

References

External links
 

 
2011 software
Freeware
XMPP clients
VoIP software
IOS software
Social media
Windows Phone software
Meta Platforms applications
Mobile applications
Instant messaging clients